Bideyiz (also, Bideyız and Bideiz) is a village and municipality in the Shaki Rayon of Azerbaijan.  It has a population of 1,258. There are ruins of an Albanian Temple on the hills of the village.

References 

Populated places in Shaki District